Miss America 2001, the 74th Miss America pageant, was broadcast from on the Boardwalk Hall in Atlantic City, New Jersey on Saturday, October 14, 2000 on ABC Network.  This was the first time that the pageant took place outside its traditional month of September. It was moved to October because the 2000 Summer Olympics were held in September.

Results

Placements

Order of announcements

Top 10

Top 5

Awards

Preliminary awards

Quality of Life awards

Non-finalist awards

Delegates

1 Age as of September 2000

Judges
 Lenny Krayzelburg
 Randolph Duke
 Sheryl Lee Ralph
 Emme
 Diedrich Bader
 Marcia Bullard
 Melanie Brock (winner of Instant Celebrity Judge contest)

References

External links
 Official Results

2001
2000 in the United States
2001 beauty pageants
2000 in New Jersey
October 2000 events in the United States
Events in Atlantic City, New Jersey